Green Lake is a natural lake in South Dakota, in the United States.

Green Lake was named on account of the green plants with it.

See also
List of lakes in South Dakota

References

Lakes of South Dakota
Lakes of Lake County, South Dakota